Steven Michael Robert Howey (born July 12, 1977) is an American film and television actor. He is known for his roles as Van Montgomery on The WB/CW television series Reba, and Kevin Ball on the Showtime series Shameless.  Howey has also appeared in the films Supercross, DOA: Dead or Alive, Bride Wars, Game Over, Man!, and Something Borrowed.

Early life and education
Howey was born in San Antonio, Texas. He has Scottish ancestry.  He graduated from Crescenta Valley High School in La Crescenta-Montrose and attended Northeastern Junior College in Sterling, Colorado, for two years on a basketball scholarship. He later attended his father’s acting workshop where he decided to become an actor.

Career
Howey has guest-starred on various TV shows including ER (1994) and The Drew Carey Show. He also starred in and produced the independent film Class (1998), which was written and directed by his father, Bill Howey, and was accepted into the Denver International Film Festival.

In 2001, Howey got his first starring role in a series when he was cast as Van Montgomery in the show Reba. Howey stayed with the show until it ended in 2007. He also appeared in Reba McEntire's music video "Every Other Weekend" with his Reba co-star Joanna García.

In 2005, he starred in the action film Supercross as K.C. Carlyle, an MX racer. Howey also played Weatherby in the movie DOA: Dead or Alive, alongside Jaime Pressly and Eric Roberts. In 2009, he starred in Bride Wars, with Anne Hathaway and Kate Hudson (with whom he also starred in the 2011 movie Something Borrowed, once again as her love interest). Howey also portrayed the title role in the 2009 film, Stan Helsing. That same year, Howey also appeared in the web series CTRL playing Ben Piller. He has also appeared on the show Psych.

In summer 2010, Howey joined the cast of the Showtime dramedy Shameless, as Kevin Ball, a series regular. Season 2 premiered January 8, 2012, with Howey remaining a main cast member. He then continued to play character Kevin Ball through the end of the show.

In 2013, Howey guest starred on an episode of Fox's New Girl entitled "TinFinity" as Jax, a professional football player and love interest of Jess (Zooey Deschanel).

In 2017, he guest-starred on Law & Order: Special Victims Unit in the episode "Intent" as Andy "The Monster" McPherson.

Personal life
Howey was married to actress and model Sarah Shahi. The two became engaged in June 2007, while vacationing in Hawaii and married on February 7, 2009, in Las Vegas. In July 2009, they had their first child, a son. Shahi had an at-home water birth. In March 2015, Shahi again home birthed their twins, a daughter and son. Howey and Shahi filed for divorce in May 2020. Their divorce was finalized in January 2021.

Filmography

Film

Television

References

External links
 
  Steve Howey at the Country Music Television

1977 births
Living people
20th-century American male actors
21st-century American male actors
Male actors from Los Angeles
Male actors from San Antonio
American male film actors
American male television actors
American people of Scottish descent